Francesca "Franky" Fitzgerald is a fictional character from the third generation of the British teen drama Skins. She is portrayed by Dakota Blue Richards.

Characterisation
Before the start of the series, Franky had been living in Oxford with her new adoptive fathers, where she was regularly bullied by gang of local girls, led by a girl named Riga. In one particularly nasty incident, Riga's gang had stripped her down to her underwear, thrown eggs and flour at her, snapped pictures of her in this condition, and posted them on the Internet, leaving her tied up in a bathroom. They then vandalised her home and her father's car. In retaliation, her only friend, Dean, ambushed Riga outside her home and threatened to burn her alive unless she stayed away from Franky. As a result, Dean was imprisoned and Franky's fathers had decided to move somewhere else and get a new start.

Frank is a complicated character, having been described in series 5 as an "androgynous and super-intelligent" girl who acts "strange". She dresses in gender neutral clothing, wears her hair short and close-cropped and, although quite aloof, tends to be quite timid and low key. In series 6, she loses her androgynous and passive nature in favour of a more feminine, headstrong and blunt personality. Nevertheless, a defining feature of her character is her troubled past, something that plagues her throughout the series and occasionally causes concern from her friends. Very little of Franky's past is explained until towards the end of the series. It is known that her mother, Maria, had put her up for adoption when she was six years old, after a comment she made suggested that she was mentally ill (although it is later suggested that her mother was mentally ill herself). Although Franky's mental state has caused concern for her friends, particularly Liv, it is never addressed in detail.

Series 5
In "Franky" introduces Franky (Dakota Blue Richards) as a timid, isolated androgynous youth. She arrives in Bristol after moving from Oxford, and is told by her fathers to try to blend in. It soon emerges that this is not an easy task, as Franky arrives at Roundview College on a motorised scooter after being chased by a gang of youths. Things do not get much better, when she is made to wear some dirty, second-hand clothes to a sports lesson. Mini McGuinness (Freya Mavor), the queen bee of the school, immediately takes issue with Franky's androgynous dress sense, due to her obsession with fashion. The two then get into a fight on the sports field. At lunch, she is approached by Alo Creevey (Will Merrick) and Rich Hardbeck (Alex Arnold), two fellow outcasts, who hope to make friends. The two are chased off by Mini and her friends, Liv Malone (Laya Lewis) and Grace Blood (Jessica Sula), and is invited to hang out later. Though she refuses at first, she eventually agrees. The three take some Miaow-Miaow and have fun at the local shopping centre. They return home to meet Franky's two dads, Geoff and Jeff (Gareth Farr and John Sessions). There, they discover via some pictures on "Friendlook" that Franky was victimised mercilessly in Oxford. The very next day, after Frank with Mini and calls her a "bulimic Barbie," Mini has her boyfriend, Nick Levan (Sean Teale), post the pictures she found on the walls of the school, causing Franky to run off, crying. She goes to a rubbish dump to smoke a joint and take out her frustration by shooting an old fridge. There, she is approached by Matty (Sebastian De Souza), Nick's older brother, who tells her she is beautiful. She then discovers Grace, who had taken an interest in her from the beginning, in her room. Empowered by these two encounters, she confronts Mini at a party, and appeals to Grace and Liv that they truly like her. When they do not verbally respond, she leaves in frustration. Grace in turn persuades Alo and Rich to go after Franky, and the three abduct her and take her to a swimming pool. There, they unite as a gang of their own.

In "Rich", Franky is approached by Rich Hardbeck to help him understand girls. She is unable to help, as she claims she does not know much about girls, but does recommend Rich talks to Grace instead.

In "Mini", Franky is recruited by Grace to help with Mini's fashion show. But Mini rejects her and decides to overhaul the show herself. However, when Mini suffers a meltdown, Franky's ideas are used instead, to a standing ovation. Franky approaches Mini outside the rave she is at later on, and explains the real reason she is friends with Liv and Grace. Empowered by this, Mini returns to the rave with Franky. In the crowd, Franky sees Matty again.

In "Liv", Franky, is the first of the gang to agree to be Mini's friend after she implores them to forgive her, and spends most of the episode smoking weed. Eventually, she passes out from it, and wakes up when Liv has kicked them out. Liv asks her to leave as well, but before leaving, she shows Liv a video of when she and Mini were children, to show her the fun times she used to have with Mini. This moves her to tears.

In "Nick", she is reunited with Matty for the first time since their earlier encounter. When it is suggested that she become Alo's girlfriend, and Matty agrees, she shoots him an angry look. She comes across Nick after he has a fight with his father, and informs him that he is not "a complete dick." This encounter inspires him to quit his rugby team and confront his father.

In "Alo", Franky is approached by Mini on a couch at Alo's party. Mini suggests that Franky is in love with Matty, though Franky vehemently denies it, and encourages her to pursue him ("Liv'd do it to you in a heartbeat"). Franky coldly leaves, and gets into a fight with a stranger at the party. While Nick, because of his previous encounter with Franky, angrily stands up for her and confronts the stranger, Liv goes outside and consoles her. For the first time in the series, Franky's sexuality is brought up, though Franky refuses to talk about it, leading Liv to believe Franky is unsure. Later, at Nick's and Matty's party, she wanders upstairs, to discover Liv and Matty having sex in his bedroom, and leaves in a flood of tears. Matty sees this, but doesn't tell Liv.

In "Grace", Franky is playing the part of Viola/Cesario in Grace's production of Twelfth Night. While rehearsing a particularly emotional scene with Matty, Liv sees the tension between them and puts two and two together, and promptly forces him to quit, partly out of fear of losing Matty, and partly out of concern that he might hurt Franky emotionally. When Grace tries to get Liv back by inviting her to a girls' night, they bring up Franky's sexuality again. This time, however, Franky gives an answer, that she is “into people”. Still suspicious, Liv asks her who she is in love with, causing her to falter. This tension gets worse when Matty, seeing that an unattractive man Franky was flirting with is being too forward, approaches and scares him off, right in front of Liv. The next day, Grace persuades Mini (who is standing in for Liv) and Franky to kiss as part of the play, shocking Alo and Rich. The already tense atmosphere between Liv, Franky and Matty is made worse when Liv, while kissing Franky in their scene, sees Matty with a shocked look on his face. In their ensuing confrontation, Liv asks Matty if he loves Franky, and he fails to give an answer. Angry, she makes it clear to him that he must choose between her or Franky, and Franky, witnessing the confrontation, is left in tears.

In "Everyone", Mini, who appears to have developed something of a crush on Franky, has been taking care of Franky since her confrontation with Liv and Matty, and angrily warns Matty to stay away from Franky. She also encourages Franky that she "deserves better." But things do not start well when Franky falls on top of Matty after Alo's van breaks down. To make matters worse, she then decides to go off with Liv and Matty when Alo's navigation skills prove wrong. The three take cocaine, and, while high, go to a nearby village, and break into a church. There, Liv begins to seduce Franky right in front of Matty, hoping he will react similarly to how he reacted earlier. But he firmly shakes his head at her, and they leave the church. They then have an argument in the forest, and, while Matty and Liv have an argument, Franky wanders off. Matty, deciding he would rather be with Franky than with Liv, goes after her, to Liv's dismay. He catches up with her, and they kiss and begin to have sex. But at that moment, Franky has a panic attack, throws him off and tears off through the forest, with a horrified Matty in hot pursuit. He reveals what has happened to Liv and Mini when he passes them by. Scared that Franky might hurt herself, the three give chase, and Franky, hearing them call her, accidentally trips and falls over the side of a cliff. Liv manages to drag her back up, and they console her. It is here that Franky reveals the origins of her nature, and that she was put up for adoption at the age of six. She reconciles with Matty later, at Grace's marquee.

Series 6
While on holiday in Morocco with the group, Franky and Matty's relationship faces problems. After an argument she parties with a drug dealer named Luke. She meets up with him at a beach party and she goes for a drive with him. Luke's friend tells Matty that he has to smuggle drugs if he wants to see Franky again. Matty decides to chase after Luke's car with Grace and Liv as passengers, but he crashes. Grace is killed and Matty goes on the run. She later tells him to never return.

Franky is still struggling to deal with Grace's death and has visions of her. Her adoptive fathers try to help her but she rebels. She skips her first exam to see Luke, he takes her to see a fight where she joins in to rid of her anger. They start to have rough sex which she enjoys. She then cheats in an exam and is suspended. She then visits Luke for more aggressive sex. During an argument with Jeff, he falls down the stairs and fractures his skull. Nick later admits that he is in love with Franky and tries to get her to stop her downward spiral. She then visits a counselor and reveals that she feels responsible for Grace's death. She goes to see Luke again, who slaps her to turn her on. Later at the pool hall a fight breaks out. Nick arrives thinking he is helping. Luke then beats up Nick, which she initially gets off on, but when it turns more violent she gets Luke to stop. After more sex with Luke that turns into rape, Franky realises that he is a bad influence and leaves him. She then sorts out her problems with Jeff.

Franky goes to see Nick, they hug which confuses Nick. Frankie discovers that Mini is pregnant and attempts to get her to tell Alo the truth. Franky and Nick spend an evening together, but when they give each other a meaningful look, she orders him to leave. Franky is not happy when she arrives at Nick's house to find him with a one night stand named Carly. Nick tells Franky that Matty wants to return to England and he needs to raise the cash to smuggle him in undetected. After an argument with Nick, he tells Franky the true extent of his feelings, but she cannot handle the situation. Franky goes to see Nick and they have sex. Franky answers a call for help from Matty, but hangs up. Franky convinces Mini to run away because she does not want the baby to be adopted. Mini realises she has to return home, with a desperate Franky clinging to her. Franky goes to Birmingham and finds her older sister, Clara, who tells her that their mother is dead. Franky returns to Bristol and, after Liv confronts her over the state she is in and her melodramatic behaviour, Mini tells her that she will have to face Nick and Matty. So Franky admits that she loves both of them, and that she can't have a relationship with them. Clara reveals that Franky's mother is still alive, and the two are reunited.

Reception
Lucy Doyle of TV Listings website On the Box compared her initial role in the series to that of Lindsay Lohan's character, Cady, in Mean Girls.

References

Skins (British TV series) characters
Television characters introduced in 2011
Fictional pansexuals
Fictional bisexual females
Adoptee characters in television
Fictional victims of sexual assault
Fictional English people
British female characters in television
Female characters in television
Teenage characters in television